Power Piggs of the Dark Age is a 2D platform game for the Super NES. A Sega Mega Drive version was planned but never released.

Gameplay

The video game takes place during the Dark Ages. In control of a group of humanoid pigs, the player's object is to defeat a warlock named the Wizard of Wolff, a humanoid wolf with strange magical powers. Each of the Power Piggs was planned to use their own medieval weapon and uses it to defeat minor enemies that lie in his path. However, the actual released version of the game featured only one playable character, Bruno, in spite of all three still appearing on the title screen.

The first stage is a typical medieval town but it only gets more surreal from there.

Doughnuts are seen as food in the game for the main characters. One of the main characters is a knight named Bruno; his secondary weapon happens to be pastries that explode on contact with the enemy.

Several in-game passwords help to reveal a mini-game in addition to hidden messages within the coding of the game itself.

Reception
Doctor Devon of GamePro  praised the player character's move set, the cartoon-style graphics, the humorous sound effects, and the fast-paced music, though he acknowledged that Power Piggs of the Dark Age lacks the sophistication of some of the more recent platform games.

Allgame gave the game a score of 3 stars out of a possible 5, with the reviewer offering some praise for the game's graphics.

References

External links
 
 

1996 video games
Surreal comedy
Slapstick comedy
Side-scrolling video games
Platform games
Titus Software games
Radical Entertainment games
Cancelled Sega Genesis games
Super Nintendo Entertainment System games
Super Nintendo Entertainment System-only games
Video games about pigs
Fictional knights in video games
Video games about wolves
Wizards in fiction
Anthropomorphic animals
Fictional rivalries
Video games about magic
Works about royalty
Fantasy video games set in the Middle Ages
Video games set in castles
Video games set in forests
Video games scored by Marc Baril
Video games developed in Canada